Unitarisk Kirkesamfund (English: Unitarian Church Society) is the Danish Unitarian Church, founded on 18 May 1900 as "Det fri Kirkesamfund" (literally, The Free Congregation) by a group of liberal Christians.
In 1992 they changed the name to the now "Unitarisk Kirkesamfund".

Since 1908, the church has been outside the Church of Denmark. Unitarisk Kirkesamfund is a member and co-founder of the International Association for Religious Freedom and the International Council of Unitarians and Universalists.

References

External links
 Danish Unitarian Church

Christian organizations established in 1900
Christian organizations based in Denmark
1900 establishments in Denmark
Unitarianism